is a series of shoot 'em up video games mainly developed by Hudson Soft. Konami has owned the rights to the series since their absorption of Hudson Soft in 2012. The first game, named Star Soldier, appeared on the MSX and NES in 1986, and the series has continued on various gaming systems. Star Soldier itself has received enhanced remakes for both the GameCube and PlayStation 2 in 2003, and a different remake for the PlayStation Portable in 2005, while the latest installment of the series was released on the Wii as a WiiWare game in 2008. In addition, Super Star Soldier, Final Soldier, Soldier Blade and Star Parodier have been re-released on the Wii's Virtual Console and on the Japanese PC Engine's Best Collection lineup for the PSP. The Star Soldier games are best known for their distinctive music, unique weapon power-ups, and a special time attack high score mode called "Caravan Mode".

Caravan gaming tournaments
Star Soldier was developed as a spiritual successor to Tecmo's Star Force, from which it borrows most of its gameplay elements. The Star Force series, along with Hudson's Star Soldier, was often featured in the popular Japanese gaming tournament known as "Hudson All-Japan Caravan Festival". Home ports of Star Soldier games would sometimes feature "Caravan" modes in which the player would race through timed stages while trying to accumulate a high score.

Common elements
Being an arcade-style game, Star Soldiers objective is primarily based on achieving a high score. The series often makes use of hidden destructible tiles that offer bonus points when shot, but may occasionally power-up the player's ship instead. Bonus points will also be awarded for defeating sequences of enemy formations while they are within a certain proximity to the player's ship, or defeating mini bosses before they have a chance to attack.

Games

1986: Star Soldier - MSX, Famicom/NES, Game Boy Advance, iOS, Wii VC, 3DS VC, Nintendo Online (Switch).
 Star Soldier Special+ - Mobile Phone
 Star Soldier SP Arcade - Mobile Phone
 Star Soldier Fukkoku-Ban - Mobile Phone
1990: Super Star Soldier - PC Engine/TurboGrafx-16, Wii VC, Windows Store, Wii U VC
1991: Final Soldier - PC Engine, Wii VC, Wii U VC
1992: Soldier Blade - PC Engine/TurboGrafx-16, Wii VC, Wii U VC
1992: Star Parodier - PC Engine CD ROM, Wii VC
1998: Star Soldier: Vanishing Earth - Nintendo 64
2008: Star Soldier R - Wii (WiiWare)
2010: Star Soldier Mission Mode - Mobile Phone
2013: Star Soldier for GREE - iOS

Crossover
2006: Star Soldier vs DoDonPachi DaiOuJou CARAVAN'06 - Mobile Phone
2018: Super Bomberman R - Nintendo Switch
2018: Pixel Puzzle Collection - iOS, Android

Compilations and remakes
1995: Caravan Shooting Collection - SNES
 Compilation of Star Force, Star Soldier and Starship Hector
2003: Star Soldier - GameCube, PS2
 3D remake with arranged stages
2005: Star Soldier - PSP
 Enhanced port of the 2003 remake
2006: Hudson Best Collection Vol. 5: Shooting Collection - GBA
 Compilation of Star Force, Star Soldier and Starship Hector
2008: PC Engine Best Collection: Soldier Collection - PSP
 Compilation of Super Star Soldier, Final Soldier, Star Parodier and Soldier Blade

Canceled games
1995: Kuma Soldier - PC-FX

Other media 
1985–1987: Famicom Rocky - Manga : Star Soldier is one of the Videogames based in the manga.
1986–1987: Nekketsu! Famicom Shounendan : Star Soldier is one of the Videogames based in the manga.
1991–1993: Cyber Boy - Manga : Soldier Blade and Star Parodier, two of the video games based in the manga.
1986:  - Anime film

Notes

References

External links
 Hard Core Gaming 101 - Star Soldier

 
Video game franchises
Video game franchises introduced in 1986